Daniel Nipkow (born 14 March 1954) is a Swiss sport shooter. He won a silver medal in 50 metre rifle three positions at the 1984 Summer Olympics in Los Angeles.

References

External links

1954 births
Living people
Swiss male sport shooters
Olympic shooters of Switzerland
Olympic silver medalists for Switzerland
Shooters at the 1984 Summer Olympics